Kozara may refer to:

Kozara, mountain in western Bosnia and Herzegovina
Kozara National Park, national park established in 1967 in the area around the Kozara mountain
Battle of Kozara (also known as Operation West-Bosnien), World War II battle between the Yugoslav partisans and Axis forces at the mountain
Kozara (film), 1962 Yugoslav film about the Battle of Kozara
FK Kozara, association football club based in Gradiška in northwestern Bosnia
Kozara, barracks in Banjaluka

It may also refer to:
Kožara, island on the Danube river in Belgrade, Serbia

See also
Kozare (disambiguation)